Abraham L. Newman (born 1973) is an American political scientist and professor in the Edmund A. Walsh School of Foreign Service and Government Department at Georgetown University and Director of the Mortara Center for International Studies. His research focuses on the ways in which economic interdependence and globalization have transformed international politics. His work has appeared in publications such as the Financial Times, Foreign Affairs, and The New York Times.

Education and Career 
Newman was raised in Columbus, Ohio. He graduated from Stanford University with a BA in International Relations and an MA in International Political Economy in 1996. In 2005, he received his PhD in Political Science from the University of California, Berkeley. He has spent many years in Germany and is fluent in German. Within the field of international political economy, Newman’s research has included topics such as digital technology and data privacy as well as global finance. Most recently, Newman and Henry Farrell coined the term “weaponized interdependence” to describe the ways in which states are increasingly using economic networks as tools of coercion to achieve strategic goals.

Books 

 Of Privacy and Power: The Transatlantic Struggle over Freedom and Security by Henry Farrell and Abraham Newman, Princeton University Press, 2019
 Roy C. Palmer Civil Liberties Prize; Best Book Award, the International Studies Association International Communication Section; Foreign Affairs Best Books of 2019
 Voluntary Disruptions: International Soft Law, Finance, and Power by Abraham Newman and Elliot Posner, Oxford University Press, 2018 
 Honorable Mention, APSA International Collaboration Section Best Book Award; Honorable Mention, ISA International Law Section Best Book Award
 Protectors of Privacy: Regulating Personal Data in the Global Economy by Abraham Newman, Cornell University Press, 2008
 How Revolutionary was the Digital Revolution: National responses, market transitions, and global technology by John Zysman and Abraham Newman, Stanford University Press, 2006

Selected articles 

 Farrell, Henry and Abraham Newman. 2020. “Will the Coronavirus End Globalization as we know it?” Foreign Affairs. March 16, 2020.
 Farrell, Henry and Abraham Newman. 2019. “Weaponized Interdependence,” International Security. 44(1): 42-79.
 Kalyanpur, Nikhil and Abraham Newman. 2019. “Mobilizing Market Power: Jurisdictional Expansion and Stock Market Delisting,” International Organization. 73(1): 1-34.
 Farrell, Henry and Abraham Newman. 2017. “BREXIT, Voice and Loyalty: Rethinking electoral politics in an age of interdependence,” Review of International Political Economy. 24(2): 232-47.
 Efrat, Asif and Abraham Newman. 2016. “Deciding to Defer: The Importance of Fairness in Resolving Transnational Jurisdictional Conflicts,” International Organization. 70(2): 409-41.
 Farrell, Henry and Abraham Newman. 2016. “The New Interdependence Approach: Theoretical Developments and Empirical Demonstrations,” Review of International Political Economy. 23(5): 713-36.
 Newman, Abraham and Elliot Posner. 2016. “Transnational Feedbacks, Soft Law, and Preferences in Global Financial Regulation,” Review of International Political Economy. 23(1): 123-52. 
 Farrell, Henry and Abraham Newman. 2014. “Domestic Institutions Beyond the Nation State: Charting the new interdependence approach,” World Politics. 66(2): 331-63.
 Kaczmarek, Sarah and Abraham Newman. 2011. “The Long Arm of the Law: Extraterritoriality and the National Implementation of Foreign Bribery Legislation,” International Organization. 65(4): 745-70. 
 Farrell, Henry and Abraham Newman. 2010. “Making Global Markets: Historical institutionalism in international political economy,” Review of International Political Economy. 17(4): 609-38.
 Bach, David and Abraham Newman. 2010. “Transgovernmental Networks and Domestic Policy Convergence: Evidence from insider trading regulation,” International Organization. 64(3): 505-528.
 Newman, Abraham. 2008. “Building Transnational Civil Liberties: Transgovernmental entrepreneurs and the European data privacy directive,” International Organization. 62(1): 103-130. 
 Eberlein, Burkard and Abraham Newman. 2008. “Escaping the International Governance Dilemma? Incorporated transgovernmental networks in the European Union,” Governance. 21(1): 25-53.
 Bach, David and Abraham Newman. 2007. “The European Regulatory State and Global Public Policy: Micro-institutions, macro-influence,” Journal of European Public Policy. 16(6): 827-846.

References 

Stanford University alumni
University of California, Berkeley alumni
1973 births
Living people
American political scientists
21st-century American male writers
Walsh School of Foreign Service faculty
Writers from Columbus, Ohio